Guelpa is a surname. Notable people with the name include: 

 Christophe Guelpa (born 1963), French Olympic sport shooter
 Guillaume Guelpa (1850–1930), French doctor, born in Italy
 Irène Guelpa, French socialist activist
 Robert Guelpa, French rower

See also
Guela (disambiguation)